Anita Andreassen (born 9 October 1960) is a Norwegian mushing competitor, and she has also competed in cycling and in cross country skiing. She is three times world champion in mushing.

Mushing
She received a bronze medal at the 1991 world championship, and gold medals in 1992, 1993 and 1994. She is three times European champion (2 individual, 1 relay), and several times National champion in mushing.

Other sports
Andreassen was national champion in road cycling in 1979. She was a member of the national team from 1977 to 1980, and has represented Norway in the world championships.

She has also competed successfully in cross country skiing.

Awards
Andreassen was awarded Egebergs Ærespris in 1996. She received Troms idrettskrets's medal of honor in 1982, and again "with star" in 2004, for her later achievements.

References

1960 births
Living people
Norwegian dog mushers
Norwegian female cyclists
Norwegian female cross-country skiers
Place of birth missing (living people)